Lucas Marques may refer to:

 Lucas Marques (footballer, born 1988), Brazilian football right-back
 Lucas Marques (footballer, born 1995), Brazilian football defensive midfielder

See also
 Lucas Márquez (disambiguation)